Fiapre is a town in Sunyani West Municipal in the Bono Region of Ghana. Fiapre is very close to the regional capital town of the Bono Region, Sunyani.

Early history
History has it that the people of Fiapre migrated first from Jukwaa in Denkyira land after the famous Feyiase war during which the Ashantis led by Nana Osei Tutu defeated the Denkyira army led by Nana Ntim Gyakari. In fact they sought refuge at Bantama in Kumasi.

During the period, many people took refuge at Bantama, which became a safe haven during Ashanti's war of expansion.  Bantama became over-populated and the people of Fiapre, led by their leader Nana Kyem Amponsah and Obaa Panin Yaa Pomaah, sought permission from their host to move further north. They were granted permission and went to stay temporarily at Techiman Baamire. They took along their black stool. The chief and elders of Techiman Baamire did not want to share their land with Nana Kyem Amponsah and Obaa Panin Yaa Pomaah so they sacked them virtually.

From Techiman Baamire, the people moved to Chiraa near Sunyani where they were received well by the people. Close by, Nana Antepim had established a village called Odomase.  He was both a farmer and a hunter. Nana Antepim visited Chiraa one day and saw the beautiful Obaa Panin Yaa Pomaah and fell in love with her. He was able to convince the people to move to Odomase.

At Odomase, the new immigrants and their hosts co-existed peacefully because it was established that most of the people of Odomase also migrated from Denkyira.

However, Nana Antepim wanted Nana Kyem Amponsah to have his freedom to reign over his people taking into account the black stool so he showed him a piece of land on the west. This is the area on and around the hill facing the current Brong Ahafo Regional Minister's Residence on the right-hand of the Berekum-Sunyani main road beyond the SDA Hospital.

When they settled over there, they found the land especially on the hill as being rocky and could not support erection of huts for accommodation.  So they called the place "Asi-apiri" literally meaning that whenever one dug, the tool "hit a rock". The place is still called Asi-apiri.

They therefore decided to move a little way to the north and settled at a place called Tweneboase named after a type of tree called Tweneboa. They felt better at the place but had a problem with access to potable water.

Meanwhile, there was still a very cordial relationship between the people of the new settlement and the people of Odomase. When they moved from Asi-apiri, they reported to their counterparts at Odomase, "We have moved from Apiri", which in Twi was stated as "Y'afiri apiri." With repetition, the new settlement became known as Firi-apiri, which name has been corrupted to Fiapre.

However, one Attah found a stream, towards the east and a little closer to Odumase, which was very accessible. The people called the stream Atta-dea, meaning "It belongs to Attah". The stream is still very active but the name has been corrupted to Ata-der.

The stream attracted the people to move towards it. They built their huts close by and found the land very fertile. The royal family of Fiapre is known as "Brofrease", because tradition has it that when they reported on the state of their newly found land, they said it was as soft "as under a pawpaw tree". Paw-paw is the English word for brofre in the Twi Language.

Education
Fiapre has one of the best female secondary schools in the region known as, Notre Damme Senior High School. It also hosts Holy Spirit School, a Catholic School aimed at holistic education. The school by far has been one of the few to receive the prestigious presidential award more than twice which shows its prestige in dominating education all round Ghana. It has two private tertiary institutions, these are the Catholic University College of Ghana and Ideas University College. In addition, the University of Energy and Natural Resources is located at Fiapre.

Economy
Agriculture is the main occupation for the people in the town, while teaching, civil service and private businesses also play a very big role. Three financial institutions namely; GN Bank, Capital Rural Bank and Drobo Community Bank Limited have their branches at Fiapre.

References

Populated places in the Bono Region